The BL 8-inch howitzer Marks VI, VII and VIII (6, 7 and 8) were a series of British artillery siege howitzers on mobile carriages of a new design introduced in World War I. They were designed by Vickers in Britain and produced by all four British artillery manufacturers, but mainly by Armstrong, and one American company. They were the equivalents of the German 21 cm Morser 16 and in British service were used similarly to the BL 9.2-inch howitzer, but were quicker to manufacture, and more mobile. They had limited service in the British Army in World War II before being converted to the new  calibre. They also equipped a small number of Australian and Canadian batteries in World War I and by the US Army in that war. They were used in small numbers by other European armies.

Design and variants

8 inch was a calibre adopted in the First World War by the British Army. The Marks VI, VII and VIII (6, 7 and 8) were a new design and not related to the stopgap early Marks I-V of 8-inch howitzer, which used shortened and bored-out naval  gun barrels.

Mark VI
The Vickers design, very similar to their 6-inch howitzer, was approved in August 1915 and first substantial order placed in March 1916 for 50 howitzers, with 30 more in the autumn. It was 4–5 tonnes lighter than the improvised 8-inch "howitzers" Mks I – V. The Mk VI barrel was of built-up construction and was 14.7 calibres long, with a range of 10,745 yards (9,825 m).

Mark VII
Introduced July 1916, the Mk VII had a longer barrel (17.3 calibres, or ) of wire-wound construction and increased the range to 12,300 yards (11,250 m). The new barrels turned out to have short service lives and suffered from cracked A tubes (the inner rifled layer of the built-up barrel).

Mark VIII

Mk VIII incorporated various small improvements and a thicker and stronger barrel.

Combat use

World War I

Early problems of stability on very hard or soft ground became apparent with the Mk VI, leading to the recoil system not functioning correctly. A Commission went to France to investigate, and a special level "Vickers platform" was adopted, to which the wheels and trail were secured for accurate shooting. A major change in the line of shooting required the platform to be relaid. Setting up and adjusting the platform was labour-intensive. The US manual describes it:
"The platform consists of wooden beams which assemble to form a triangular platform. The spade must be removed and a special bracket fitted on the trail when using this platform. This bracket travels in a groove which gives a bearing for the bracket and also provides a means of traversing the piece 52° on the platform. The main objects in the use of the firing platform are: To provide a reliable support for the wheels and rear end of the trail, so as to prevent sinking or movement when firing on soft ground; to ensure the gun remaining on the target when firing; and to provide means for shifting the trail transversely through an angle of 52° (26° each side of center). By using the traversing gear on the carriage a total traverse of 30° on each side of the center is obtainable... The carriage wheels rest on steel plates on the wheel platform and are guided by curved-steel angles which prevent lateral movement of the gun off the target when in action. When the firing platform is used, the float plate, with spade attached, which is bolted to the underside of the trail, is removed and another float plate, having a thrust bracket attached, is bolted in its place".

At the end of World War I on the Western Front Canada had two 6-gun batteries, Australia 1, Britain 37. British 8-inch howitzer batteries serving in other theatres at the Armistice were: UK 1 (6 guns), Macedonia 1 (4 guns), and 2 guns in Palestine

World War II

By the start of World War II some Mk 8s were still in use and were used in France in May to June 1940. In March 1940, 266 weapons were authorised for transfer from the United States to the British. After the Fall of France, the remaining guns were used for training only. In 1941 a further 168 weapons (the remaining US stock) were authorised for transfer to the British under Lend-Lease. With no guns left, they were declared obsolete by July 1943.

Some Vickers 8-inch guns were present in Japanese island fortifications during the Pacific Campaign.

Use by United States

Versions of the Mk 6 were manufactured in the United States by Midvale Steel and Ordnance Co, Nicetown, Pennsylvania during World War I, initially supplied to Britain and then used to equip US forces when it entered the war. These were designated the M1917 in US service.

A US Mk 7 and Mk  version was also manufactured and adopted in US service from October 1918 as the M1918. Quoting from the US Army manual of 1920 on artillery in US service:
"The 8-inch howitzer materiel is called the "Vickers" model of 1917, of which there are in use two types, the Mark VI and Mark VII. The main differences between the Mark VI and Mark VII being that the former has a lower muzzle velocity and consequently a shorter range than the latter, also that the Mark VII has a barrel of the "wire wound" construction, whereas the Mark VI type is of the "built up" construction...

The Mark VII has lately been superseded by a Mark VIII , the difference between the two being that the powder chamber walls of the Mark VII proved to be too thin, while the Mark VIII  overcomes this defect by having thicker powder chamber walls...

... the average life of the 8-inch howitzer, Mark VI, [before the barrel needs relining] is 7,800 rounds, while that of the Mark VIII  is 3,000 rounds.

The Mark VI howitzer has a muzzle velocity of 1,300 feet per second and a maximum range of 10,760 yards and is of British design and both British and American manufacture. The Mark VII howitzer has a muzzle velocity of 1,525 feet per second and maximum range of 12,280 yards and is of British design and manufacture.

The Mark VIII  is an American modification of the British wire-wound Mark VIII howitzer to permit of a built up type of construction and is strictly of American manufacture. The Mark VIII  has the same muzzle velocity and range as the Mark VIII.

Due to the combination of British and American manufacture, there are several types of breech mechanism in service; the two main types are the T and the French percussion type...

The Mark VIII  howitzer is also of the built-up-construction type, but differs from the Mark VI howitzer in that it consists of two tubes, an inner and an outer, over which is shrunk the jacket. The jacket in this case supports the howitzer, without the use of guide rings. A breech ring is shrunk on over the jacket and carries a lug for connecting the gun to the recoil mechanism. A breech bushing similar to that of the Mark VI is fitted for the breech mechanism. The total length of this howitzer is about  feet [compared to Mk VI  feet] and its maximum range is approximately 12,360 yards. This howitzer is mounted on the Mark VII carriage".

The 58th Regiment Coast Artillery Corps (C.A.C.) was in action in France in the final days of World War I with the US-manufactured Mk 6, and the 44th, 51st, and 59th Regiments were in action with British-manufactured versions. An additional six regiments, three with each type of gun, are described as being nearly ready for the front at the time of the Armistice. Each regiment had an authorised strength of 24 guns.

A total of at least 285 M1917 (Mark 6), 116 M1918 (Mark 7), and 61 M1918 (Mark ) weapons were acquired by the US Army, plus 16 for the US Marine Corps. 52 weapons were purchased from the British beginning in January 1918; subsequent inventory figures indicate they were in addition to these totals. By 1922 the 8-inch howitzers were withdrawn from active units and stored as war reserves. A 1926 inventory showed 508 howitzers and 646 carriages in Army hands. An approximate total of 530 howitzers were acquired. In 1933 some of the howitzers' Asbury breech mechanisms were used in developing the 155 mm gun T3, eventually the M1 "Long Tom". In 1934 the Marine Corps weapons were transferred to the Army. In March 1940 466 weapons were on hand; 266 of these were authorised for transfer to the British. A further 32 weapons were transferred to Finland in September 1940. In 1941 the remaining weapons were authorised for transfer to the British under Lend-Lease. None of these weapons were donated as war memorials, and none survive in the United States.

Use by Finland

During the Russo-Finnish Winter War, Finland found itself in dire need of heavy artillery. Thirty-two "8 in Howitzer Mk 7 (Vickers Mk 6)" 8-inch howitzers were bought from the United States in 1939 but arrived too late to see action in the war. The howitzers were given the designation 203 H 17 (203 mm, Haupitsi [Finnish for howitzer], 1917) and were first issued to three heavy artillery battalions (1st, 2nd and 3rd), which later were re-organised into six heavy artillery batteries (11th, 12th, 13th, 14th, 15th and 16th). The howitzer was well-liked by the Finnish army for its durability. Thirteen of these howitzers were lost in the battles of the summer of 1944; eight of these belonged to Heavy Artillery Battery 4 and were lost at Valkeasaari on 10 June, while the other five belonged to Heavy Artillery Battery 3, located northeast of Lake Ladoga. The howitzers were stored after the war and were struck from the lists in the late 1960s.

Operators
 – 6 pieces, 54th Siege Artillery Battery, Royal Australian Artillery
 – 32 artillery pieces, known as 203 H 17

 – Royal Garrison Artillery (amalgamated in 1924 into Royal Artillery)
 – (see History Of The Fifty-Eighth Artillery C.A.C.)
 – 72 howitzers Mk VI (203 mm howitzer Mk. 1916). Also served in Red Army.

Image gallery

Surviving examples
National Defence College Military Museum, Helsinki Finland
Artillery Museum, Hämeenlinna, Finland
Mk VIII at Canadian War Museum, Ottawa, Canada
Additional weapons are reportedly displayed in the United Kingdom and Russia

See also
 List of howitzers
 United States home front during World War I

Weapons of comparable role, performance and era
 21 cm Mörser 16 – German equivalent
 220 mm TR mle 1915/1916 – French equivalent

Notes

References

Bibliography
Published references
Dale Clarke, British Artillery 1914–1919. Heavy Artillery. Osprey Publishing, Oxford, 2005 
 
General Sir Martin Farndale, History of the Royal Regiment of Artillery. Western Front 1914–18. London: Royal Artillery Institution, 1986 
General Sir Martin Farndale, History of the Royal Regiment of Artillery : Forgotten Fronts and the Home Base 1914–18. London:The Royal Artillery Institution, 1988 
I.V. Hogg & L.F. Thurston, "British Artillery Weapons & Ammunition 1914–1918". London: Ian Allan Publishing, 1972.
Handbook of artillery : including mobile, anti-aircraft and trench matériel (1920). United States. Army. Ordnance Dept, May 1920
Handbook of the Mark VI

British National Archives MUN5/373/9227
Иванов А.: Артиллерия СССР во Второй мировой войне; Нева 2003; Санкт-Петербург

Internet references
Ross Mallett, AIF 1914–1918 Artillery
8 inch Howitzer Mk VI–VIII at Landships
Joe Hartwell, Defeating the Hun. History of United States Army Coast Artillery Corps During World War One.
Joe Hartwell, "8-inch British Howitzer" US-built versions
History Of The Fifty-Eighth Artillery C.A.C.
Finnish Army 1918–1945. 203 mm H/17 Howitzer
Om den engelske 8-tommers haubits 1915–1940 (Danish)

External links

 Handbook of the B. L. 8-inch howitzers, marks VI to VIII, on travelling carriages. 1920. Hosted online by State Library of Victoria, Australia
 Gun drill for 8-inch B.L. howitzer Marks VII. VII*, VII** and VIII carriages Marks VII and VIIa 1920 1923 Hosted online by State Library of Victoria, Australia

 Video clips on YouTube
 BL 8-inch Howitzer Marks VI – VIII at Landships
 Bill Maloney, Photograph of example in WWI camouflage paint at Canadian War Museum

World War I howitzers
World War I artillery of the United Kingdom
World War II artillery of the United Kingdom
World War I artillery of the United States
World War I artillery of Australia
203 mm artillery
Vickers
World War II howitzers